Mitteleschenbach is a municipality in the district of Ansbach in Bavaria in Germany.

References

Ansbach (district)